Michael James Anderson (born July 30, 1966) is a former Major League Baseball player who pitched for the Cincinnati Reds in . He made his major league debut on September 7 against the St. Louis Cardinals. He pitched 1 of an inning, allowed 6 hits, 7 earned runs, and gave up 2 of 4 home runs in a single game hit by Mark Whiten. He only appeared in two more games after that. On December 10, 1993, he was traded with Darron Cox and Larry Luebbers to the Chicago Cubs for Chuck McElroy but he never made it to the majors with the Cubs. He continued to pitch in the minors until 1997, when he headed to Korea. In 1998, Anderson recorded a save in Game 3 of the 1998 Korean Series for the LG Twins, becoming the first American-born hurler to accomplish this feat.

After serving as a pitching coach in the Chicago Cubs' farm system from 2000 to 2006, he became a scout at the pro level for the Texas Rangers. His younger brother is current Milwaukee Brewers TV play-by-play announcer Brian Anderson.

References

External links

Career statistics and player information from Korea Baseball Organization

1966 births
Living people
Major League Baseball pitchers
Cincinnati Reds players
Baseball players from Austin, Texas
Indianapolis Indians players
American expatriate baseball players in South Korea
Navegantes del Magallanes players
LG Twins players
Ssangbangwool Raiders players
Texas Rangers scouts
Southwestern Pirates baseball players
American expatriate baseball players in Australia
American expatriate baseball players in Venezuela
Albuquerque Dukes players
Billings Mustangs players
Cedar Rapids Reds players
Chattanooga Lookouts players
Gulf Coast Reds players
Greensboro Hornets players
Iowa Cubs players
Oklahoma City 89ers players
San Antonio Missions players
San Bernardino Stampede players
Sultanes de Monterrey players
American expatriate baseball players in Mexico